Jalili is a Persian and Arabic surname. Notable Iranian people with the surname include:

 Abolfazl Jalili (born 1957), Iranian film director
 Omid Djalili (born 1965), British-Iranian comedian and actor
 Saeed Jalili (born 1965), Iranian politician

The name also applies to the Iraqi Jalili or al-Jalili family (Arabic:الجلیلی).

Iranian-language surnames
Arabic-language surnames